Asterogyne ramosa is a species of flowering plant in the family Arecaceae. It is found only in Venezuela.

References

ramosa
Flora of Venezuela
Least concern plants
Taxonomy articles created by Polbot